The 1998–99 FA Cup qualifying rounds opened the 118th season of competition in England for 'The Football Association Challenge Cup' (FA Cup), the world's oldest association football single knockout competition.  A total of 558 clubs were accepted for the competition, down five from the previous season’s 563.

The large number of clubs entering the tournament meant that the competition started with preliminary and four qualifying knockouts for these non-League teams. The 32 winning teams from Fourth qualifying round progressed to the First round proper, where League teams tiered at Levels 3 and 4 entered the competition.

Calendar

Preliminary round
Matches were played on weekend of Saturday 21 August 1998. A total of 172 clubs took part in this stage of the competition, including 44 clubs from the four divisions at Level 7 of English football and 128 clubs from sixteen lower level leagues, while other 44 clubs from the four divisions at Level 7 of English football and 162 clubs from lower level leagues get a bye to the First qualifying round.

First qualifying round
Matches were played on weekend of 4 September 1998. A total of 292 clubs took part in this stage of the competition, including the 86 winners from the preliminary round and 206 clubs, who get a bye to this round, including 44 clubs from the four divisions at Level 7 of English football.

Second qualifying round
Matches were played on weekend of 18 September 1998. A total of 212 clubs took part in this stage of the competition, including the 146 winners from the first qualifying round and 66 Level 6 clubs, from Premier divisions of the Isthmian League, Northern Premier League and Southern Football League, entering at this stage.

Third qualifying round
Matches were played on weekend of 2 October 1998. A total of 128 clubs took part, 106 having progressed from the second qualifying round and 22 clubs from Football Conference, forming Level 5 of English football, entering at this stage.

Fourth qualifying round
Matches were played on weekend of 16 October 1998. A total of 64 clubs took part, all having progressed from the third qualifying round.

1998–99 FA Cup
See 1998–99 FA Cup for details of the rounds from the first round proper onwards.

External links
 Football Club History Database: FA Cup 1998-99
 The FA Cup Archive

Qual
FA Cup qualifying rounds